"I'm Me" is a song by American rapper Lil Wayne, released as the second single from his EP The Leak.

Background
The song was originally titled "1000 Degreez", and was originally intended to be the opening track on his upcoming album Tha Carter III: however, after the song was leaked, it was cancelled from the album and instead put on The Leak along with four other leaked songs from the album. It was later included as a bonus track on the bonus disc version of Carter III, with the tracks from The Leak comprising the bonus disc. Lil Wayne referenced the song on his song "3 Peat", the eventual first track from Tha Carter III which replaced "I'm Me".

Samples
The track contains samples of Lil Wayne's previous songs "Go DJ", "Fireman", "Hustler Musik", and "Cash Money Millionaires". The song also contains samples of T.I.'s "Rubberband Man". The instrumentals are sampled from "God Moving Over the Face of the Waters" by Moby.

In popular culture
Professional wrestler Bobby Lashley has also used the song as entrance music for his MMA and professional wrestling bouts.

UFC fighter Mike Perry used this song for his entrance theme at UFC on FOX 26 when facing Santiago Ponzinibbio

Charts

References

2007 songs
Lil Wayne songs
Cash Money Records singles
Songs written by Lil Wayne
2007 singles